Love Scenes is the fourth studio album by Canadian singer Diana Krall, released on August 26, 1997, by Impulse! Records.

Reception
Mary Kunz of The Buffalo News wrote, "This is a quiet recording, smooth and almost too uniform in texture. Krall's piano is silky and subdued, and she tends to yield most of the instrumental spotlight to her exquisite sidemen – guitarist Russell Malone and bassist Christian McBride. She keeps a lid on passion."

Track listing

Personnel
Credits adapted from the liner notes of Love Scenes.

 Diana Krall – piano, lead vocals, liner notes
 Russell Malone – guitar
 Christian McBride – bass
 Tommy LiPuma – production
 Al Schmitt – recording, mixing
 Lawrence Manchester – recording engineering assistance
 Koji Egawa – mixing engineering assistance
 Doug Sax – mastering
 Marsha Black – project coordination
 Rocky Schenck – photography
 Hollis King – art direction
 Isabelle Wong – graphic design

Charts

Weekly charts

Year-end charts

Certifications

References

External links
 

1997 albums
Albums produced by Tommy LiPuma
Diana Krall albums
Impulse! Records albums